The following is a list of women who have won the Miss Supranational title.

Miss Supranational titleholders

Countries by number of wins

Continents by number of wins

Gallery of winners

Runners-up and finalists

1st Runner Up

2nd Runner Up

3rd Runner Up

4th Runner Up

Notes

References

External links
Official Miss Supranational website - Past titleholders

Miss Supranational
Miss Supranational titleholders
Miss Supranational titleholders